The Atlantic Revolutions (22 March 1765 – 4 December 1838) were numerous revolutions in the Atlantic World in the late 18th and early 19th century. Following the Age of Enlightenment, ideas critical of absolutist monarchies began to spread. A revolutionary wave soon occurred, with the aim of ending monarchical rule, emphasizing the ideals of the Enlightenment, and spreading liberalism.

In 1755, early signs of governmental changes occurred with the formation of the Corsican Republic and Pontiac's War. The largest of these early revolutions was the American Revolution of 1765, where American colonists felt that they were taxed without representation by the Parliament of Great Britain, and founded the United States of America after defeating the British. The American Revolution partially inspired other movements, including the French Revolution in 1789 and the Haitian Revolution in 1791. These revolutions were inspired by the equivocation of personal freedom with the right to own property—an idea spread by Edmund Burke—and by the equality of all men, an idea expressed in constitutions written as a result of these revolutions.

History

It took place in both the Americas and Europe, including the United States (1765–1783), Polish–Lithuanian Commonwealth (1788–1792), France and French-controlled Europe (1789–1814), Haiti (1791–1804), Ireland (1798) and Spanish America (1810–1825). There were smaller upheavals in Switzerland, Russia, and Brazil. The revolutionaries in each country knew of the others and to some degree were inspired by or emulated them.

Independence movements in the New World began with the American Revolution, 1765–1783, in which France, the Netherlands and Spain assisted the new United States of America as it secured independence from Britain. In the 1790s the Haitian Revolution broke out. With Spain tied down in European wars, the mainland Spanish colonies secured independence around 1820.

In long-term perspective, the revolutions were mostly successful. They spread widely the ideals of liberalism, republicanism, the overthrow of aristocracies, kings and established churches. They emphasized the universal ideals of the Enlightenment, such as the equality of all men, including equal justice under law by disinterested courts as opposed to particular justice handed down at the whim of a local noble. They showed that the modern notion of revolution, of starting fresh with a radically new government, could actually work in practice. Revolutionary mentalities were born and continue to flourish to the present day.

The common Atlantic theme breaks down to some extent from reading the works of Edmund Burke. Burke firstly supported the American colonists in 1774 in "On American Taxation", and took the view that their property and other rights were being infringed by the crown without their consent. In apparent contrast, Burke distinguished and deplored the process of the French revolution in Reflections on the Revolution in France (1790), as in this case property, customary and religious rights were being removed summarily by the revolutionaries and not by the crown. In both cases he was following Montesquieu's theory that the right to own property is an essential element of personal freedom.

National revolutions
 Corsican Revolution (1755–1769)
 Pontiac's War (1763–1766)
 American Revolution (1765–1783)
 Geneva Revolution (1782)
 Northwest Indian War (1785–1795)
 Revolt of Dutch Patriots (1785)
 French Revolution (1789–1799)
 Liège Revolution (1789–1795)
 Brabant Revolution (1790)
 Haitian Revolution (1791–1804)
 In the British Virgin Islands, minor slave revolts occurred in 1790, 1823 and 1830.
 Polish War in the defence of constitution (1792) and Kościuszko Uprising (1794)
 Stäfner Handel in Canton of Zürich, Switzerland (1794–1795)
 Batavian Revolution (1795)
 Slave revolt in Curaçao (1795)
 Bush War, Saint Lucia (1795)
 Fédon's rebellion, Grenada (1796)
 Second Maroon War, Jamaica (1795–1796)
 Second Carib War, Saint Vincent (1795–1797)
 Scottish Rebellion (1797)
 United Irish Rebellion (1798)
 Helvetic Revolution (1798)
 Altamuran Revolution (1799)
 Fulani Jihad (1804–1808), establishing the Sokoto Caliphate
 1811 German Coast uprising (1811, Louisiana)
 Norwegian War of Independence (1814)
 Decembrist revolt (1825) and Chernigov Regiment revolt (1825–1826)
 Upper and Lower Canada Rebellions (1837–1838)
 Latin American wars of independence
 Brazilian revolutionary movements
 Minas Conspiracy in Minas Gerais, Brazil (1789)
 Bahian Revolt (Conjuração Baiana) in Bahia, Brazil (1798)
 Pernambucan Revolt in Pernambuco, Brazil (1817)
 War of Independence of Brazil (1821–1824)
 José Leonardo Chirino's Insurrection, Venezuela (1795)
 Spanish American wars of independence (1808–1833)
Argentine War of Independence
May Revolution (Argentina and neighbouring countries, 1810)
 Oriental Revolution (Uruguay, 1811)
 Chilean War of Independence
 Peruvian War of Independence
 Bolivian War of Independence
 Military career of Simón Bolívar (Northern and Western South America)
 Ecuadorian War of Independence
 Patria Boba (Colombia)
 Venezuelan War of Independence
 Mexican War of Independence (1810–1821)

Various connecting threads among these varied uprisings include a concern for the "Rights of Man" and freedom of the individual; an idea (often predicated on John Locke or Jean-Jacques Rousseau) of popular sovereignty; belief in a "social contract", which in turn was often codified in written constitutions; a certain complex of religious convictions often associated with deism or Voltairean agnosticism, and characterized by veneration of reason; abhorrence of feudalism and often of monarchy itself. The Atlantic Revolutions also had many shared symbols, including the name "Patriot" used by so many revolutionary groups; the slogan of "Liberty"; the liberty cap; Lady Liberty or Marianne; the tree of liberty or liberty pole, and so on.

Individuals and movements
 George Washington (United States)
 John Adams (United States)
 Thomas Jefferson (United States)
 Alexander Hamilton (United States)
 Benjamin Franklin (United States)
 Sons of Liberty (North America)
 Maximilien Robespierre (France)
 Marquis de Lafayette (France and North America)
 Georges Danton (France)
 Napoleon Bonaparte (France and most of Europe)
 Jacobin Club (France, 1789–1794)
 Société des Amis des Noirs (France)
 Patriots (Netherlands)
 Richard Price and Joseph Priestley (Great Britain)
 Thomas Paine (Great Britain and North America)
 Society of the Friends of the People (Great Britain, 1792-)
 London Corresponding Society (Great Britain)
 Society of the United Scotsmen (Scotland)
 Nore mutiny (Great Britain)
 Society of the United Englishmen
 Wolfe Tone (Ireland)
 Society of United Irishmen (Ireland, 1791–1804)
 Lautaro Lodge
 Pasquale Paoli (Corsica)
 Usman Dan Fodio (West Africa)
 Charles Deslondes (German Coast)
 Francisco de Miranda
 Société des Fils de la Liberté (Canada)
 Louis-Joseph Papineau (Canada)
 William Lyon Mackenzie (Canada)
 Samuel Lount (Canada)
 John Lambton 1st Earl of Durham (Canada, United Kingdom)
 Tadeusz Kościuszko (United States, Poland-Lithuania)
 Toussaint Louverture (Haiti)
 Inconfidência Mineira (Brazil, 1789)
 Conjuração baiana (Brazil, 1798)
 Simón Bolívar (Venezuela, Colombia, Ecuador, Peru, Bolivia)
 José de San Martín (Argentina, Chile, Peru)
 José Gervasio Artigas (Uruguay, Argentina)
 José María Morelos (Mexico)
 Miguel Hidalgo y Costilla (Mexico)
 Agustín de Iturbide (Mexico)
 Vicente Guerrero (Mexico)

See also
 Age of Revolution
 Atlantic history, on historiography
 Atlantic World
 Piracy in the Atlantic World

Notes

References and further reading
 Canny, Nicholas, and Philip Morgan, eds. The Oxford Handbook of the Atlantic World: 1450–1850 (Oxford UP, 2011).
 Donoghue, John. Fire under the Ashes: An Atlantic History of the English Revolution (U  of Chicago Press, 2013).
Geggus, David P. The Impact of the Haitian Revolution in the Atlantic World (2002)
Jacques Godechot. France and the Atlantic revolution of the eighteenth century, 1770–1799 (1965)
Gould, Eliga H. and Peter S. Onuf, eds. Empire and Nation : The American Revolution in the Atlantic World (2004)
Greene, Jack P., Franklin W. Knight, Virginia Guedea, and Jaime E. Rodríguez O. "AHR Forum: Revolutions in the Americas", American Historical Review (2000) 105#1 92–152. Advanced scholarly essays comparing different revolutions in the New World. in JSTOR
Klooster, Wim. Revolutions in the Atlantic World: A Comparative History (2nd ed. 2018)
 Leonard, A.B. and David Pretel, eds. The Caribbean and the Atlantic World Economy(2018)
Palmer, Robert. The Age of Democratic Revolutions 2 vols. (1959, 1964)
 Perl-Rosenthal, Nathan. "Atlantic cultures and the age of revolution." William & Mary Quarterly 74.4 (2017): 667–696. online
 Polasky, Janet L. Revolutions without Borders (Yale UP, 2015). 392 pp. online review
 Potofsky, Allan. "Paris-on-the-Atlantic from the Old Regime to the Revolution." French History 25.1 (2011): 89–107.
Sepinwall, Alyssa G. "Atlantic Revolutions", in Encyclopedia of the Modern World, ed. Peter Stearns (2008), I: 284 – 289
Verhoeven, W.M. and Beth Dolan Kautz, eds.  Revolutions and Watersheds: Transatlantic Dialogues, 1775–1815 (1999)
 Vidal, Cécile, and Michèle R. Greer. "For a Comprehensive History of the Atlantic World or Histories Connected In and Beyond the Atlantic World?." Annales. Histoire, Sciences Sociales 67#2 (2012). online

 
Revolutionary waves
Age of Enlightenment
Revolutions
18th-century revolutions
19th-century revolutions
Age of Revolution